Metasia grootbergensis is a moth in the family Crambidae. It was described by Wolfram Mey in 2011. It is found in Namibia.

References

Moths described in 2011
Metasia